The Parker House is a historic building located in Guttenberg, Iowa, United States.  This two-story brick structure with a brick lean-to addition, which houses the kitchen, was built in 1858.  It is one of the oldest residences in town.  The house sits on the back of the lot facing the alley.  The building was listed on the National Register of Historic Places in 1984.

References

Houses completed in 1858
Houses in Guttenberg, Iowa
Houses on the National Register of Historic Places in Iowa
National Register of Historic Places in Clayton County, Iowa